The Tanzania Davis Cup team represents the Tanzania in Davis Cup tennis competition and are governed by the Tanzania Tennis Association. They currently compete in the Africa Zone of Group IV.

History
Tanzania competed in its first Davis Cup in 2022. Their best result was finishing third in their Group IV pool in 2022.

Players

Recent performances
Here is the list of all match-ups of the Tanzania participation in the Davis Cup in 2022.

See also
Davis Cup

References

External links

Davis Cup teams
Davis Cup
Davis Cup